This is a chronological list of games based on Toho's Godzilla franchise .

Since the early 1980s, a variety of video games have been developed and released on various platforms. The majority of these games were exclusively released in Japan, while others were either later released in internationally, or developed in the United States.

Video games

Titles released in the 1980s

Titles released in the 1990s

Titles released in the 2000s

Titles released in the 2010s

Titles released in the 2020s

 
}}

Cancelled titles

Related titles

Board games

Card games

See also
 Gamera 2000

Notes

References

External links
 Toho Kingdom.com - Video Games
 MyGodzillaGames.com - Online Godzilla Games

 
Kaiju video games
Lists of video games by franchise